This is a list of monumental masons, also known as memorial masons:

A
Thomas Adye (mason), English, active in early-to-mid-18th-century England
Monument to William Mitchell (Huntingdonshire MP) (c.1703–1745) in St. Mary's Church (Fowlmere, Cambridgeshire).
Monument to Sir John Cotton (d.1712) in St. Nicholas' Church (Landwade, Suffolk).
 Memorial to Hugo Raymond (d.1737) removed from the old "humble medieval village church" upon its replacement with the new St. George, Beckenham, Kent (1885–87) in the south aisle, built by architect W. Gibbs Bartleet of Beckenham.
J. Annis, English, active in early-to-mid-18th-century England
 Memorial to John Styleman (d.1734) monument, "a large hanging one with cartouches of arms pinned to a pyramid, was erected after 1750" in St. Mary's Church, Bexley, Kent.
John Wormald Appleyard, English, active 1851–1891.
 Many cemetery monuments
 Memorial to J.F. Longrigg, St Paul's, Shipley, West Yorkshire, 1890

B
J. Bacon and S. Manning of London, (also Bacon Junior and S. Manning), English, active in early 18th-century England
Monument to John Bones (d.1813) in St. Mary's Church (Fen Ditton, Cambridgeshire).
Memorial to James Antrobus Newton (d.1823), in St. Mary's Church, Stockport, Greater Manchester, depicting a kneeling female figure.
John Bacon Jr. (of London, 1777–1859) (see above), English sculptor and monumental mason, active in early 19th-century England, son of John Bacon (1740–1799)
 Memorial to Thomas and Sophia Lambard, "a pair of large, exceedingly restrained tablets by John Bacon Jun., 1813." In St. Peter and St. Paul, Ash, Kent.
Carlo Bergamini (1870–1934), Italian-New Zealander
E. Bingham of Peterborough, English, active in early 18th-century Cambridgeshire.
Monument in Rococo style to R. Lane (d.1732) and Mrs. Lane (d.1754) in St. Mary's Church (Gamlingay, Cambridgeshire).
Blore, English monumental mason, active in late-18th-century Cambridgeshire (designed a tablet in the north transept of Ely Cathedral).
Miles Brien (alias O'Brien) (fl. 1782–1806) of Rathduff,"exemplifying the later eighteenth- and nineteenth-century Irish Churchyard Sculpture tradition in County Wexford."
Memorials in Ferns Cathedral graveyard.
James Byrne (fl. 1775–1819) and Patrick Byrne (fl. 1795–1837) of Clone, Ireland "exemplifying the later eighteenth- and nineteenth-century Irish Churchyard Sculpture tradition in County Wexford."
Memorials in Ferns Cathedral graveyard.
Boehm, English monumental masons active in mid-19th-century Cambridgeshire.
Monument to Mrs. Montagu (d.1871) in St. Margaret's Church (Newton, Cambridgeshire).
Solon H. Borglum, sculptor and monumental mason active in 19th-century New York
Charles Adolph Schieren (1842–1915) in Green-wood Cemetery, Brooklyn, New York.
Charles Bottomley, English, active in mid-18th-century England. Designer of the Gregory Wale, Esq. (d.1739) Memorial, known as the Obelisk on Maggots Mount in Harston, Cambridgeshire.
John William Bowden (active 1920s), monumental mason of Matlock, signed as "BOWDEN MATLOCK".
Bushnell, English, active in mid-17th-century Cambridgeshire
Monument to Richard Bennet (d.1658) and Sir Thomas Bennet (d.1667), two white, life-size standing figures against a black backcloth in St. Peter's Church (Babraham, Cambridgeshire).

C
Charles Calverley, famed sculptor and monumental mason active in 19th-century New York
Monument to Elias Howe Jr. (1819–1867), located at the intersection of Battle Avenue and Hemlock Avenue in Green-wood Cemetery, Brooklyn, New York.
R. Chambers, English monumental mason active in mid-to-late-18th-century Kent.
 Memorial to Richard Savage (d.1772), tablet with branches at the sides by Chambers who signed it in English and Hebrew, located in St. Peter's Church, Boughton Monchelsea, Kent.
Tom Church, Scottish, (Brechin, Scotland), presently active, designer of the Wallace Monument
Sir Francis Chantrey, English sculptor and monumental mason active in early-to-mid-19th-century England.
 Memorial to Catherine Vansittart (d.1810), a "large hanging monument, this time with a profile medallion on a draped altar," attributed to Chantrey by style. It was removed from the old "humble medieval village church" upon its replacement with the new St. George, Beckenham, Kent (1885–87) in the south transept, built by architect W. Gibbs Bartleet of Beckenham.
Monument to Samuel Knight (d.1829) in All Saints Church (Milton, Cambridgeshire).
Sir Henry Cheere (1703 – 15 January 1781) was a renowned 18th-century English sculptor and monumental mason. He was "the first English-born sculptor to match the virtuosity of the continentals" and "formed his style on the small, crisp, cirvaceous shapes of the French sculptor [Roubiliac], though his monuments never approached Roubiliac’s in ease and inventiveness. Much of his work is unsigned, as is his commonly considered c.1760 masterpiece at Shadoxhurst, Kent.
 F. W. Commons was a monumental mason, trained in Europe (there is some speculation this was from 1858 to 1860), who was commissioned to carve four allegorical figures, each 12 ft high, for £2,100 to crown the front of Parliament House, Melbourne, though it never eventuated due to the depression. He set up as a monumental mason at Ballarat in 1880. He was then advertising from Creswick Road, 'blue stone, granite and marble masonry, engraving, carving and sculpture’ as well as 'City and Garden sculpture’. Much of his work can be seen in the historic buildings and gardens of Ballarat. A catalog of his work can be seen in F.W. Commons monuments, Libraries Australia ID 8859827.

Carl Conrads (1839–1920), German-born American sculptor at New England Granite Works, Hartford, Connecticut.
The American Volunteer (1876) at Antietam National Cemetery, Sharpsburg, Maryland. The granite statue – 21 ft 6 in (6.55 m) tall; 44 ft 7 in (13.59 m) with base – was likely the largest sculpture in the United States prior to the Statue of Liberty.
Alexander Hamilton (1880), Central Park, New York City.
Many Civil War monuments.
G. Cooper of Canterbury, English monumental mason active in the mid-19th century in Kent.
 Memorial to Sir William Cosway Monument, a stone obelisk located quarter-mile west of St. Peter and St. Paul's Church, Bilsington, Kent. Cosway was a Member of Parliament for Kent "who fell off a stage coach here in 1835, and was killed. G. Cooper of Canterbury fecit. Struck by lightning" in the 1960s and thereafter threatened with demolition.
John Cramb & Son, English monumental masons active in the 1880s in Camden, London.
Joshua Cushing of Norwich, English monumental mason active in early 19th-century England.
Tablet to Charles Garneys d.1808 in Holy Trinity Church (Guilden Morden, Cambridgeshire).

D
H Daniel, (active 1870s) English monumental mason of London.
John Dixon of London, English monumental mason active in mid-to-late-18th-century England.
Wall-mounted obelisk memorial to Rev. Harry Trotter d.1766 in St. Botolph's Church (Graveley, Cambridgeshire).
Durdles, the fictional monumental mason in Charles Dickens' The Mystery of Edwin Drood.

E
Joseph Edwards (1814–1882), Welsh

F
R B Farbridge (active 1890s), around South Shields, Tyne and Wear.
John Flaxman, English monumental mason active in late-18th-century and early 19th-century England
Coffin-shaped tablet of Captain Serocold (d.1794) in St Andrew's Church, Cherry Hinton, Cambridgeshire.
 Memorial to Frances Hoare (d.1800), a “Grecian tablet, notably severe by comparison with the earlier monuments. Mourning members of her family, contemporarily dressed, in relief on either side of inscription.” It was removed from the old “humble medieval village church” upon its replacement with the new St. George's Church, Beckenham, Kent (1885–87) in the north transept, built by architect W. Gibbs Bartleet of Beckenham.
Monument to Sir Charles Cotton, Admiral of the White (d.1812).
Monument to Mrs. E. Knight in All Saints Church (Milton, Cambridgeshire).
John Franklin (d.1831), English, "monumental mason of local note whose tablets frequently appear in east Wiltshire and neighbourhood".
John Frazee, carver active in mid-19th-century New York.
Charlotte Canda (1828–1845) monument in Green-wood Cemetery, Brooklyn, New York (with carver Robert Launitz).

G
E. Gaffin of London, English monumental mason of Regent Street, London active in the early 19th century
White marble sarcophagus memorial of Thomas Quintin (d.1806) in St. George's Church (Hatley St. George, Cambridgeshire).
T. & E. Gaffin of London (see above), English monumental masons of Regent Street, London active in the mid-19th century
Memorial to Jemima Wilson (d.1865). "Still in the pre-Chatnrey tradition, with its female wreathing an urn with flowers. Signed by Gaffin, and poorly carved." It was removed from the old "humble medieval village church" upon its replacement with the new St. George's Church, Beckenham, Kent (1885–87), built by architect W. Gibbs Bartleet of Beckenham.
Geddes, Shakespeare & Co., 208 Girod Street, New Orleans, Louisiana
Sebastian Swoop Edifice (Mausoleum) in Greenwood Cemetery, New Orleans.
Eric Gill (1882–1940), English monumental mason
Francis Grigs, English monumental mason active in the mid-17th-century England
 "Black and white marble tablet to Herbert Randolph, with Corinthian side pilasters, ostentatiously signed by Francis Grigs, Fecit Anno 1645." Located in All Saints Church, Biddenden, Kent.
Robert Grumbold (d.1720), English, a mason with his own memorial in St Botolph's Church, Cambridge.

H
Christopher Horsnaile, English, monumental masons active in early eighteenth-century England (see also Edward Stanton
Monument to Bishop Fleetwood of Ely (d..1723) in north chancel aisle of Ely Cathedral.
John Hickey, English monumental mason active in late-eighteenth-century England
Memorial to Amy Burrell (d.1790), a “hanging monument, large but detailed with delightful delicacy,” removed from the old “humble medieval village church” upon its replacement with the new St. George's Church, Beckenham, Kent (1885–87) in the south transept, built by architect W. Gibbs Bartleet of Beckenham.
"Hooper, sculptor," English, active in late-19th-century Devon.
Wall-mounted memorial in Hatherleigh, Devon.
Humphrey Hopper (active 1830s), English, active in Cambridge, Cambridgeshire
Memorial to the Rev. Charles Simeon d.1836 in Holy Trinity Church (Cambridge), "epitaph in Gothic forms."

J
Tim Johnson of Carving and Restoration Team in Manassas, Virginia, American stone carver presently responsible for the CIA Memorial Wall.
N Johnson, English monumental mason active in the early 17th-century Cambridgeshire, the monument of Sir Giles Allington (d.1613) and Lady Allington in All Saints Church (Horseheath, Cambrdigeshire) is attributed to him.

K
D. Kindersley, English, active mid-20th century
Monument (completed 1947) to Mrs. Mary Robinson (d.1939) in St. Mary's Church (Dullingham, Cambridgeshire).

L
Robert Launitz, sculptor and monumental mason active in mid-19th-century New York
Do-Hum-Me, (1824–1843) "Indian Princess Monument." in Green-wood Cemetery, Brooklyn, New York.
Charlotte Canda (1828–1845) monument in Green-wood Cemetery, Brooklyn, New York (with carver John Frazee).
Latham of Manchester, English monumental mason firm, active in mid-19th-century England
Memorial to Mrs Hawall (d.1852) in St. Mary's Church, Stockport, Greater Manchester, depicting angels hovering over her body.

M
J. Mallcott (of London), English monumental masons active in mid-19th-century London.
"A. W. Law, Esq." (d. 1824), wall-mounted memorial tablet (signed by Mallcott on the memorial underside) first erected in St. Matthew's Church, Friday Street, City of London, and removed 1883 to St. Vedast-alias-Foster, London, when St. Matthew's was demolished in 1885.
S. Manning of London, see J. Bacon and S. Manning of London
Midcounties Co-operative, English
EH Mills, (active 1910s), monumental mason of Hampstead, London.
John M. Moffitt, monumental mason, designer and sculptor active in mid-19th-century New York
Brown Family: Steamer Arctic Sinking (1854) located on Hillock Avenue within Serpentine Path Knoll, in Green-wood Cemetery, Brooklyn, New York.
Monumental Bronze Company, American, Bridgeport, Connecticut, active between 1875 and 1912 with their subsidiaries in the United States and Canada manufactured rust-resistant white bronze (zinc) monuments.
Clarence D. MacKenzie (1849–1861) "Our Drummer Boy" Monument, located in Soldiers’ Lot – Atlantic Avenue, between Meadow Avenue and Linden Avenue in Green-wood Cemetery, Brooklyn, New York.
Kurten Obelisk in Metairie Cemetery, New Orleans, Louisiana.
Karl Muller, famed sculptor and monumental mason active in 19th-century New York
John Matthews (1808–1870), located on the Valley Avenue at Hill Side Path in Green-wood Cemetery, Brooklyn, New York.

N
T. Nichols, active in early 18th-century Cambridgeshire
Recumbent effigy with praying hands monument to Canon Selwyn (d.1875) of Selwyn College, Cambridge and the Selwyn Divinity School, Cambridge in south chancel aisle of Ely Cathedral.
Samuel Nixon (sculptor), English monumental masons active in mid-19th-century London.
"Martha Hatch, daughter of Henry Emlyn of Windsor" (d.1838) first erected in St. Matthew's Church, Friday Street, City of London, and removed 1883 to St. Vedast-alias-Foster, London, when St. Matthew's was demolished in 1885.
Noble, English monumental masons active in mid-19th-century Cambridgeshire.
Monument to Christopher Pemberton (d.1870) in St. Margaret's Church (Newton, South Cambridgeshire).
J. Nolan (fl. 1824–35) of Ferns, "exemplifying the later eighteenth- and nineteenth-century Irish Churchyard Sculpture tradition in County Wexford."
Memorials in Ferns Cathedral graveyard.
John Nost (mason), English monumental mason active in late-17th-century and early-18th-century England.
 Memorial to Sir John Banks (d.1699) in St. Peter's Church, Aylesford, Kent, "a stupendous pile of marble, rising to the roof. Sir John, in a wig, cravat, and semi-Roman dress, stands in an elegant pose by an urn on a tall pedestal. On the other side his wife, robed as a Roman matron, leans pensively on the pedestal. Below, their son, Caleb, reclines on his elbow, in Roman armour and wig. Backcloth held by flying putti, side pilasters, wide arching cornice and, at the very top, a garlanded cartouche of arms. Flowery Latin inscription. Everything indeed that could set a suitable seal on the career of a  nouveau riche." attributed to the sculptor John Nost on grounds of style.

O
Anselm Odling, English, active early-to-mid-20th century, mentor to sculptor Roy Noakes.
Francis O'Hara (architect) (1830–1900), Irish-American.
Jay Gould Family Mausoleum (1892), Woodlawn Cemetery (Bronx, New York).

P
Payne of St. Ives, English monumental mason from St. Ives practicing throughout England.
Urn memorial tablet of Robert Underwood d.1792 in St. Peter's Church (Boxworth, Cambridgeshire).
Andrew Lang Petrie (1854–1928), Australian.
Philip, English, active in 19th-century Cambridgeshire, England.
Executed a design by Sir George Gilbert Scott for the copper effigy of Dr. Hodge-Mill (d.1853) in the north aisle of Ely Cathedral.
Physick, English monumental masons active in mid-19th-century Cambridgeshire.
Monument to Christopher Pemberton (d.1850) in St. Margaret's Church (Newton, Cambridgeshire).
Elias Claeszoon Pickenoy (1565, Antwerp – 1640, Amsterdam), Dutch, father of Nicolaes Eliaszoon Pickenoy
Pitbladdo, a four-generation family of Scottish masons, started by William Pitbladdo who established their monumental workshop in 1842 outside the gates of Green-wood Cemetery in Brooklyn, New York. Thomas Pitbladdo succeeded his father in the 1860s and '70s, his son Grant Pitbladdo opened the shop outside Green-wood's eastern gate. Willard and Kenneth Pitbladdo were the fourth generation; all are buried in Green-wood.
Presbrey Leland Incorporated, New York City
Pfizer Family Memorials: Emile Pfizer in Green-wood Cemetery, Brooklyn, New York (1866–1941).
Richard Potter, (c.1800), "Builder and Monumental Mason".
J. N. B. de Pouilly, blacksmith of New Orleans, Louisiana
The Sociedad Ibera de Beneficence Muerta tomb in St. Louis II Square, New Orleans.
Grailhe Gates in St. Louis II Square, New Orleans.
Ambrose Poynter, English monumental masons active in early 20th-century England.
Mausoleum (1922) in St. Margaret's Church (Newton, Cambridgeshire).
Pritchard, Builder (of London), English monumental mason firm active in early-to-mid-19th-century London, England.
A number of similar memorial tablets in St Botolph-without-Bishopsgate, City of London, including Jeffryes (c.1836) and Webb (c.1832).
Keith Henry Pitt (1944-2010), English monumental mason and Letter cutter for S&A Robinson of Norwich

R

Thomas Rawlins (1727–89) A Norwich-based monument mason with many examples of his work in several churches there.
Reeves of Bath, English, active c.1768 to the 1860s in Bath, Somerset
Cambridgeshire (with one tablet at St. Mary and St. John's Church (Hinxton, Cambridgeshire)).
Wenzel Render, Czech, a monumental mason and privileged imperial architect, designer of Holy Trinity Column in Olomouc
Rogers of Bath, English, active in 19th-century Bath, Somerset.
Frank Rusconi (1874–1964), Australian

Sid Robinson (retired), English stonemason and craftsman active in the Norfolk Norwich area

S

Peter Scheemakers (1691–1781), Flemish Roman Catholic sculptor who worked from 1716 in London, Great Britain
Monument to Canon Fleetwood of Ely, Cambridgeshire (d.1737) in north chancel aisle of Ely Cathedral.
Executing the William Kent-designed sculptural monument to William Shakespeare, erected 1740 in Poets' Corner in Westminster Abbey, London.
Monument to John Dryden in Westminster Abbey, London.
Memorial to Sir Christopher Powell (d.1742), in St. Peter's Church, Boughton Monchelsea, Kent. "Grandiose but firgid standing monument. White marble figures in Roman dress. He reclines on his elbow on a black sarcophagus, his mother standing on one side, his wife bending towards him on the other. The faces of them are unattractively coarse and podgy."
Memorial to Sir John Norris, a hanging monument with a bust dated 1750 in St. George's Church, Benenden, Kent.
 Mr. Charles Selby, Builder, English, active in mid-19th-century England)
 The Albert Memorial, Abingdon, 1863.

Shout of Holborn, English, active in early 19th-century England.
Monument to Mrs. Mary Crop (d.1808) in St. Mary's Church (Dullingham, Cambridgeshire).
Daniel Sephton of Manchester, ‘Feeit(?)’, English, active in mid-18th-century England.
Wall-mounted memorial of Sarah Jarvis, wife of Samuel Jarvis, Esq. (1711?—17 July 1748) in Chester Cathedral.
Memorial to William Wright (d.1753) in St Mary's Church, Stockport, Greater Manchester.
R. Sheppard Marble and Stone Works, 171 Queen Street, Toronto, Ontario. Active in 19th-century Ontario. "This number now lies approximately at the junction of Queen Street and University Avenue, an area of eight-lane divided macadam and massive granite buildings. The number 171 no longer exists."
William Stanford (1837–1880), Australian,
Charles Stanley, English, active in mid-18th-century England.
Executed a monument Humphrey Smith (d.1743), designed by John Sanderson in the cloister of Ely Cathedral.
Edward Stanton (sculptor) of London (1681–1734), an Englishsculptor and monumental mason, and monumental mason active in early 18th-century England, and son of William Stanton (mason)
Monument to Bishop Fleetwood of Ely (d..1723) in north chancel aisle of Ely Cathedral.
Monument to Sir Marmaduke Dayrell and his mother
Thomas Stanton, English monumental mason active in mid-17th-century England.
Memorial to Robert Heath (d.1649), a set of alabaster reclining figures, Robert is robed as a judge. "Thomas Stanton agreed to make a monument in 1664, and only charged 60 pounds,"according to the late Rupert Gunnis. The memorial is in the north aisle of St. Martin's Church, Brasted, Kent.
William Stanton (mason) of London ((1639–1705), father of Edward Stanton (sculptor), was an English monumental mason active in late-seventeenth-century England.
William Stead, (early 1800s), carver and monumental mason of York, England
Nicholas Stone, English sculptor, builder, mason, monumental mason to the Royal Court
 Memorial to Sir Francis Barnham (d.1634), only two calcined busts survive high in the north aisle of St. Peter's Church, Boughton Monchelsea, Kent.

T
James Havard Thomas, sculptor active in late-nineteenth-century England
Wall-mounted memorial to Mary Carpenter in Bristol Cathedral, 1878
 Tucker, Mason, English, active in or around nineteenth-century Bath, Somerset.
 Treasure, Mason, English, active in or around nineteenth-century Bath, Somerset.
 Samuel Thatcher (1825–1899), monumental mason, Taunton, Somerset. Active – mid to late 19th century.

V
Harold Vogel, American stone carver who created the first 31 stars. of the CIA Memorial Wall and its inscription when the Wall was created in July 1974.

W

Henry Weekes (14 January 1807–1877) was an English sculptor and monumental mason, best known for his portraiture. He was among the most successful British sculptors of the mid-Victorian period.
 Memorial to William, Lord Auckland (d.1814), "Grecian tablet with a profiule medallion in very low relief. Carved in 1849 by Henry Weekes" It was removed from the old "humble medieval village church" upon its replacement with the new St. George's Church, Beckenham, Kent (1885–87) in the south transept, built by architect W. Gibbs Bartleet of Beckenham.
 White, English, active in or around 19th-century Bath, Somerset)
 Mr. G. P. White of London, English, active in mid-19th-century England)
 The Chesapeake Memorial, Portsmouth, 1863.
Paton Wilson, English,
brass tablet of R. Booth Campbell-Brown d. 1893 in the Arts and Crafts style, set in St. Mary the Great (Cambridge).
Wilton, English monumental mason, active in late-18th-century Cambridgeshire, who designed the monument to Elizabeth Bacon and her brother Peter Standly in St. Mary's Church (Linton, Cambridgeshire)
Winslow Brothers Company of Chicago, Illinois, foundry active in the 1890s.
Richard Westmacott the Elder (1747–1808), sculptor and monumental mason active in late-18th-century England.
Memorial to Mrs. Elizabeth Jeaffreson (d.1778) in St. Mary's Church (Dullingham, Cambridgeshire).
Standing wall monument to Christopher Jeaffreson (d.1789) in St. Mary's Church (Dullingham, Cambridgeshire).
Sir Richard Westmacott the Younger (1775–1856) RA, renowned sculptor and monumental mason.
Memorials to William Pitt the Younger and Charles James Fox in Westminster Abbey
Memorial to Sir George Warren (d.1801) in St. Mary's Church, Stockport, Greater Manchester, depicting a standing female figure by an urn on a pillar.
 Memorial to Mary, Countess of Darnley (d.1803), a "sarcaphogus with scrolls at the ends and putto heads, with half-spread wings" in the churchyard north of the chancel of St. Lawrence, Bidborough, Kent.
Memorial to John Turton (d.1806) was the doctor of King George III of Great Britain. His heavily Grecian memorial tablet in St. Martin's Church, Brasted, Kent, features Doric columns beside the inscription and a sarcophagus. On the latter books and serpent-entwined staff. It was designed and carved by the renowned Sir Richard Westmacott.
Memorial to Mary Turton (d.1810), a "relief of a classically robed man leaning pensively on an altar ‘To Gratitude.’".
Memorial to Lt. General Christopher Jeaffreson (d.1824) (by Sir Richard Westmacott) in St. Mary's Church (Dullingham, Cambridgeshire).
Memorial to Rev. Charles Prescott (d.1820), showing a seated effigy. in St. Mary's Church, Stockport, Greater Manchester.
Memorial to Commander Charles Cotton (d.1828) at St. Mary Magdalene's Church (Madingley, Cambridgeshire).
Memorial to William Pemberton (d.1828) at St. Margaret's Church (Newtown, Cambridgeshire).
Richard Westmacott III RA (1799–1872)
The tomb of Philip Yorke, 3rd Earl of Hardwicke at St Andrew's Church in Wimpole, Cambridgeshire
Monument commemorating Sir John Franklin's lost Arctic expedition of 1845, now in the Chapel sacristy at Greenwich Hospital, south-east London
Joseph Wilton, English monumental mason active in late-18th-century England,
Memorial to Stephen Hooker (d.1755), memorial executed after 1788 and features a "tall, slender ahnging monument of white marble, detailed with exceeding refinement."
Robert Wood & Co. Makers Phila of Philadelphia, Pennsylvania
Pelton Tomb (with maker's mark on the door) in Greenwood Cemetery, New Orleans.
Wood and Miltenberger of Philadelphia, characterized by vermiculated rustication on corners and sides and additional classical ornament on cast-iron mausoleum
Miltenberger Tomb (attributed to Wood and Miltenberger) in Greenwood Cemetery, New Orleans.
Woodcock and Meacham, architects and monumental masons in Massachusetts formed by Woodcock and George F. Meacham (1831–1917).
W. Wright, English, active in mid-17th-century Cambridgeshire.
Monument to Dorothe and Lionel Allington (d.1638).

Y
Yang Bin (mason) (born c.1963), Chinese, monumental mason in Zhenwu Shan cemetery.

References

External links

A list of monumental masons in the UK
Historical California Cemetery Stone & Monument Carvers & Dealers Historical Research, a very comprehensive site of California historical monumental masons
The NATIONAL ASSOCIATION OF MEMORIAL MASONS, 1 Castle Mews, Rugby, Warwickshire CV21 2XL
The New Zealand Master Monumental Masons Association, P.O. Box 58129, Whitby, Porirua 5245, New Zealand

+
monumental masons